The 1935–36 season was Galatasaray SK's 32nd in existence and the club's 24th consecutive season in the Istanbul Football League.

Squad statistics

Squad changes for the 1935–36 season
In:

Out:

Competitions

Istanbul Football League

Standings

Matches
Kick-off listed in local time (EEST)

Friendly Matches

References
 Tekil, Süleyman. Dünden bugüne Galatasaray, (1983), page(72-75, 141, 160-161, 181-182). Arset Matbaacılık Kol.Şti.
 Futbol vol.2. Galatasaray. Page: 564, 587. Tercüman Spor Ansiklopedisi. (1981)Tercüman Gazetecilik ve Matbaacılık AŞ.
 Ulus Newspaper Archives November 1935, January 1936, July 1936

External links
 Galatasaray Sports Club Official Website 
 Turkish Football Federation - Galatasaray A.Ş. 
 uefa.com - Galatasaray AŞ

Galatasaray S.K. (football) seasons
Turkish football clubs 1935–36 season
1930s in Istanbul